Parmotrema stuppuem is a corticolous (bark-dwelling), foliose lichen that belongs to the large family Parmeliaceae. The lichen is commonly known as the powder-edged ruffle lichen and is listed as apparently secure by the Nature Conservancy.

Description 
Parmotrema stuppuem grows to around 2–20 cm in diameter with broad, dull, smooth gray lobes that are 4–8 mm wide. The underside is black and brown with a central collection of simple rhizines.

Habitat and range 
Parmotrema stuppuem has a pantropical and pantemperate distribution, and is found across North America with a majority of samples being collected in and around the Great Lakes region of the United States. In Mexico, P. stuppeum is one of the most common foliose lichens found at intermediate to fairly high elevations in the mountains. It also occurs in Europe, southern Africa, southern Asia, and Central America.

Chemistry 
Antioxidants have been extracted from Parmotrema stuppuem. Additionally the lichen is a promising host for the development of antibacterial compounds.

See also 

 List of Parmotrema species

References 

stuppuem
Lichen species
Taxa named by Thomas Taylor (botanist)
Lichens described in 1847
Lichens of North America
Lichens of Asia
Lichens of Central America
Lichens of Europe
Lichens of Southern Africa